A geneticist is a biologist or physician who studies genetics, the science of genes, heredity, and variation of organisms. A geneticist can be employed as a scientist or a lecturer. Geneticists may perform general research on genetic processes or develop genetic technologies to aid in the pharmaceutical or and agriculture industries. Some geneticists perform experiments in model organisms such as Drosophila, C. elegans, zebrafish, rodents or humans and analyze data to interpret the inheritance of biological traits. A basic science geneticist is a scientist who usually has earned a PhD in genetics and undertakes research and/or lectures in the field. A medical geneticist is a physician who has been trained in medical genetics as a specialization and evaluates, diagnoses, and manages patients with hereditary conditions or congenital malformations; and provides genetic risk calculations and mutation analysis.

Education
Geneticists participate in courses from many areas, such as biology, chemistry, physics, microbiology, cell biology, bioinformatics, and mathematics. They also participate in more specific genetics courses such as molecular genetics, transmission genetics, population genetics, quantitative genetics, ecological genetics, epigenetics, and genomics.

Careers
Geneticists can work in many different fields, doing a variety of jobs. There are many careers for geneticists in medicine, agriculture, wildlife, general sciences, or many other fields.

Listed below are a few examples of careers a geneticist may pursue.  

 Research and Development
 Genetic counseling
 Clinical Research
 Medical genetics
 Gene therapy
 Pharmacogenomics
 Molecular ecology
 Animal breeding
 Genomics
 Biotechnology
 Proteomics
 Microbial genetics
 Teaching
 Molecular diagnostics
 Sales and Marketing of scientific products
 Science Journalism
 Patent Law
 Paternity testing
 Forensic DNA
 Agriculture

References

zh-yue:遺傳學家
Science occupations